Pozdino is a rural locality (a village) in Kisnemskoye Rural Settlement, Vashkinsky District, Vologda Oblast, Russia. The population was 10 as of 2002.

Geography 
Pozdino is located 20 km northwest of Lipin Bor (the district's administrative centre) by road. Pozdino is the nearest rural locality.

References 

Rural localities in Vashkinsky District